Falbygden is a geographical area, centered at the town of Falköping in Västergötland,
in southwestern Sweden, and covered mostly by farmland.  Most of the area belongs to Falköping Municipality and the west part of Tidaholm Municipality. In medieval times the area belonged to the hundreds Frökind, Gudhem, Vartofta, and Vilske. It is known for its geology, flora and megalithic culture.

Neolithic period in Falbygden

Iron Age

Medieval Falbygden 

The Falbygden area has many medieval churches, since almost every parish in the area had a Romanesque church built in the late 11th, 12th, or early 13th century.

Museums in Falbygden

General sources 
 Falbygdens Hembygds- och Fornminnesförening, Falbygden (1927-) periodical.
 Falbygdens museum, Forntid på Falbygden (1995).
 Falbygdens museum, se spåren på Falbygden - ....och tusen år till - fortsätter i landskapet (2000).

Geography of Västra Götaland County